This is a list of properties and districts on the island of Hawaii in the U.S. state of Hawaii that are listed on the National Register of Historic Places. The island is coterminous with Hawaii County, the state's only county that covers exactly one island. There are 94 properties and districts on the island, including 10 historic districts, six National Historic Landmarks, and one National Historic Landmark District.

Current listings

|}

See also

List of National Historic Landmarks in Hawaii
National Register of Historic Places listings in Hawaii

References

External links
 Historic Hawaii Foundation
 National and State Registers of Historic Places for Hawaii County

History of Hawaii
Hawaii County, Hawaii
Hawaii